Ban Pao is a tambon (subdistrict) of Mae Taeng District, in Chiang Mai Province, Thailand. In 2020 it had a total population of 4,179 people.

Administration

Central administration
The tambon is subdivided into 7 administrative villages (muban).

Local administration
The whole area of the subdistrict is covered by the subdistrict administrative organization (SAO) Ban Pao (องค์การบริหารส่วนตำบลบ้านเป้า).

References

External links
Thaitambon.com on Ban Pao

Tambon of Chiang Mai province
Populated places in Chiang Mai province